William Gruber may refer to:
 William H. Gruber (born 1935), American organizational theorist
 William R. Gruber (1890–1979), United States Army general
 William C. Gruber, American physician-scientist, pediatrician, and business executive
 William Gruber, organ maker and inventor of the View-Master